The Incheon Airport Maglev is a maglev line in South Korea opened on 3 February 2016. It is the world's second commercially operating unmanned urban maglev line after Japan's Linimo. The trains are lighter, cutting construction costs in half. The majority of construction was completed by November 2012.

It links Incheon International Airport Terminal 1 to Long Term Parking, Incheon Airport Administration Complex, Paradise City entertainment precinct, and Yongyu station and Leisure Complex while crossing Yeongjong Island. The line is not part of the Seoul Metropolitan Subway System. It is free of charge for all riders. It initially operated between 09:00 and 18:00. Hours have been extended to between 07:30 and 20:00. Departures are every 15 minutes from all stations. It offers a transfer to Incheon International Airport Terminal 1 station of AREX.

This maglev line specifically utilizes electromagnetic suspension (EMS) and linear induction motor (LIM) propulsion. The train is one of the first commercial maglev trains since the 1980s. Two more stages are planned of 9.7 km and 37.4 km. Once completed it will become a circular line. These lines make up a core project that the Korea Rail Network Authority managed.

During the COVID pandemic the line was reduced to operate during the am & pm Rush Hours only - departing Airport Terminal 1 Station every 15 minutes from 07:30 to 09:00 and 18:00-1900. The reduced service was still operating in May 2022 but was expected to return to full-time service shortly after.

The line was temporarily closed from 14 July 2022 due to maintenance and repair of the carriages not being completed on time (required every 3 years) as per the Railroad Safety Act. According to signs posted at stations in February 2023, service will not resume until July 31, 2024, resulting in a closure of over two years.

Stations 

All stations are located in Jung District, Incheon.

History 
The maglev train, nicknamed ECOBEE, was co-developed by the Korea Institute of Machinery and Materials (known as the KIMM which is part of the Korea University of Science and Technology) and Hyundai Rotem.

This train was part of Korea's Urban Maglev Program (UMP) which started in December 2006. This program reached out to prominent companies and organizations in the railway concentrations previously mentioned. The UMP represents Korea's push for R&D in maglev systems in order to engender a magnetic levitation transportation system to replace Korea's current urban transportation means. This program was expected to be the equivalent of US$450 million. Contributions were made from Incheon International Airport Corp. and the city of Incheon.  This train system is the result of a development project started in 1989 within the Korea Institute of Machinery and Materials (KIMM).

Rolling stock 
Hyundai Rotem manufactured the rolling stock for this line and is the entity that managed its development.

Past Research 
While a magnetic levitation train is capable of performing at extremely high velocities, the configurations so far consume more energy than the trains that are being used currently. This setback is one of the barriers that is preventing magnetic levitation trains from being commercialized past the experimental and entry phase.

Train systems such as the Incheon Airport Maglev use air brakes and electric brakes. However, magnetic levitation trains use regenerative braking and plugging braking as opposed to normal trains using regenerative braking and air braking. Regenerative braking is used when the speed of the motor exceeds the synchronous speed. When this happens, the motor changes current flow so that the motor brakes. After this happens, the excess power is converted to power for the motor. Plugging braking is used when the supply terminals are switched, but it is criticized as a wasteful practice, because in order to switch the terminals, an external resistor needs to be implemented as a stopper for the current flow.  As a result, a lot of power is squandered.

With the Urban Transit Maglev (now referred to as the "Incheon Airport Maglev") in South Korea as a test model, a study was conducted on exploring the relationship between the variation of slip frequency and energy efficiency of regenerative braking. The slip frequency decreases the limit for the regenerative extinction point. After testing, researchers noticed that this decrease of the frequency led to a decrease in the conversion time of the phase current back into the system. This decreased the required energy to brake, thus accumulating more regenerated power.

References

External links 
  About Maglev Train (English)
 Maglev promotional brochure (Korean)
 Future Rail Database (Korean) "인천공항 자기부상열차"
 "Maglev Test," Korea JoongAng Daily (English) "Maglev Test"

Driverless Maglev
Railway lines opened in 2016
 
Incheon International Airport
Rail transport in Incheon
Rapid transit in South Korea
2016 establishments in South Korea